Chief clerk may refer to:

Clerk (legislature), the senior administrative officer of a legislature
Chief Clerk of the California State Assembly, an officer of the California State Assembly
Chief Clerk (United States Department of State), the second highest official of the Department of State from 1789 to 1853
The senior clerk of any business, organisation, or department, often a senior official rather than a low-level administrative officer; now often obsolete
The senior administrative non-commissioned officer or warrant officer of a British Army unit, often known as the orderly room sergeant